The Ontario Mining Cup is an annual mining industry ice hockey tournament held  in Timmins, Ontario at the McIntyre Arena. The event is currently hosted by the Porcupine branch of the Canadian Institute of Mining, Metallurgy and Petroleum (CIM). The event was founded as an education fundraiser by mining engineer and mayor of Timmins Steve Black, in 2014. Proceeds from the tournament go towards scholarships, bursaries and awards for mining students at the Haileybury Campus of Northern College.

Format
The tournament is a round robin competition followed by a single elimination playoff that has determined the mining industry champion since the inaugural 2014 Ontario Mining Cup Hockey Tournament. The tournament features 16 teams representing  mining sector organizations.

Champions

A division

B division

See also
Canadian Institute of Mining, Metallurgy and Petroleum

References

External links
Ontario Mining Cup 

Ice hockey tournaments in Canada
Sport in Timmins